Jawahar Yadav, alias Pandit, was an Indian politician. He was leader of the Samajwadi Party. He was elected as Member of the Uttar Pradesh Legislative Assembly from Jhunsi Vidhansabha of Allahabad district (which was converted into Phulpur Vidhansabha after 2008 delimitation). Jawahar was originally from Jaunpur who came to neighboring district Allahabad in search of employment and started the business of liquor and extracting morang sand from the Ganga-Yamuna basin.

Rise in politics
Along with business, he started trying his luck in politics as well and in 1989 joined the Janata Dal, the party of the then Chief Minister Mulayam Singh Yadav, later in 1992, when Mulayam Singh Yadav formed the Samajwadi Party, he joined it. Jawahar soon joined Mulayam Singh Yadav's close circle.Jawahar Yadav had made his inroads strong in a short time in the stronghold of veteran SPs like Pandit Janeshwar Mishra, Rewati Raman Singh. SP chief Mulayam Singh Yadav used to take Jawahar's name in every meeting of the district. Jawahar used to be on his platform, due to this, Jawahar Yadav was made the candidate of Samajwadi Party from Jhunsi assembly in the 1993 assembly elections. Being a flamboyant young leader who was elected MLA from here, he was also close to veteran leaders of SP. Due to which his identity soon became among the leaders of the state level.

Gang war between Jawahar and Karwariya family
Jawahar Yadav's power increased a lot after becoming MLA, now he was becoming the Bahubali of the Ganga-Yamuna basin, in which the Karwariya family, which was already established in the business of Morang sand, was coming in front of him, very soon Gang wars started between Karwariya Family and Jawhar Pandit.Jawahar Yadav started occupying the contract for extracting morang sand from Yamuna river from one side and Karwariya family came on the backfoot, then a meeting was held for reconciliation agreement that both should not interfere in each other's work but Jawahar Yadav did not listen. He hounded Maula Maharaj, the head of the Karwariya family, at gun point.
After the dissolution of the Legislative Assembly in 1996, Jawahar Yadav's security as an MLA became lax, although he requested the government to increase his security several times, but the government did not pay heed. On August 16, 1996, when he was going to visit the Bade Hanuman ji located at Triveni Sangam in Prayagraj, his car was surrounded and killed in the Civil Lines area, along with his driver and a security guard also died for the first time. Happened when AK-47 rifle was used in the murder of a politician. Karwariya brothers accused of murderThose who have been sentenced to life imprisonment by the court and are now serving their sentence

Family
Jawahar Yadav was married to Vijama Yadav. They have 3 children (2 daughters and 1 son). After his murder, his wife Vijma Yadav came into politics, she has been elected MLA four times till now (2 times from Jhunsi and 2 times from Pratappur).

References

Samajwadi Party politicians

1996 deaths
Year of birth missing